Penelope Anne Coelen (born 15 April 1940) is a retired South African actress, model and beauty queen who was Miss World 1958. She was the first major international titleholder to come from Africa.

Early life 
Penelope Anne Coelen was from Durban, and attended Durban Girls' High School.

Career 
In the 1958 Miss World pageant, a total of 22 contestants from Europe, the Americas, Asia and Africa competed in the finals. Europeans dominated the semi-finals, but Penelope Anne Coelen, an 18-year-old secretary who played piano in the talent competition, was selected for the crown.

She gained widespread international attention during her reign and received several lucrative modelling offers. The South African designer of her gowns, Bertha Pfister, also gained increased attention.

After her reign as Miss World 1958, she tried her luck out in Hollywood with the help of James Garner, but failed her screen test. She later managed her own line of clothing and endorsed beauty products, particularly perfumes. She appeared as a contestant on the television game show To Tell the Truth on 25 November 1958. She celebrated the 2014 Miss World win of South Africa's Rolene Strauss, and gave public appearances with the younger woman.

Personal life 
Coelen returned to South Africa, and married wealthy sugarcane farmer Michel "Micky" Rey from the Natal Province. They raised five sons. She ran a guesthouse, worked as a beauty consultant, and gave lectures. Her son Nicholas Rey died in 2016, twelve years after he was severely injured in a polo accident. The Nicholas Rey Foundation Trust, founded in 2007, is named in his memory. Her husband Micky Rey died in 2019.

References

External links

 British Movietone newsreel coverage of 1958 Miss World, on YouTube.

1939 births
Living people
Miss World winners
Miss South Africa winners
Actors from Durban
White South African people
Miss World 1958 delegates
Alumni of Durban Girls' High School